Shurgol or Shur Gol or Shur Gel or Shoor Gel may refer to:
 Shur Gol, Bileh Savar, Ardabil Province
 Shurgol, Meshgin Shahr, Ardabil Province
 Shurgol, East Azerbaijan
 Shur Gel, West Azerbaijan